Bessy Mireya del Rosario Gallardo Prado (born 31 December 1984) is a Chilean who was elected as a member of the Chilean Constitutional Convention.

References

External links
 

Living people
1984 births
Chilean women lawyers
21st-century Chilean politicians
University of the Americas (Chile) alumni
Members of the Chilean Constitutional Convention
21st-century Chilean women politicians
Chilean LGBT politicians
Chilean bisexual people
People from Santiago
21st-century Chilean LGBT people
21st-century Chilean lawyers